Star Wars: Shadow of the Sith is a Star Wars novel by Adam Christopher and. published by Del Rey Books. It was released in hardcover, Ebook and audiobook on July 28, 2022, and will be released in paperback on March 28, 2023.

See also
 List of Star Wars books, the list of novels published in the Star Wars series

References

Novels based on Star Wars
2022 American novels
2022 science fiction novels
Del Rey books